The Theban alphabet is a writing system, in particular a substitution cipher of the Latin alphabet, used by early modern occultists and popular in the Wicca movement.

Publication history
It was first published in Johannes Trithemius's Polygraphia (1518) in which it was attributed to Honorius of Thebes "as Pietro d'Abano testifies in his greater fourth book". However, it is not known to be extant in any of the known writings attributed to D'Abano (1250-1316). Trithemius' student Heinrich Cornelius Agrippa (1486–1535) included it in his De Occulta Philosophia (Book III, chap. 29, 1533). It is also not known to be found in any manuscripts of the writings of Honorius of Thebes (e.g. Liber Iuratus Honorii, translated as The Sworn Book of Honorius), with the exception of the composite manuscript found in London, British Library Manuscript Sloane 3853, which however openly identifies Agrippa as its source.

Uses and correlations

It is also known as the Honorian alphabet or the Runes of Honorius after the legendary magus (though Theban is dissimilar to the Germanic runic alphabet), or the witches' alphabet due to its use in modern Wicca and other forms of witchcraft as one of many substitution ciphers to hide magical writings such as the contents of a Book of Shadows from prying eyes. The Theban alphabet has not been found in any publications prior to that of Trithemius, and bears little visual resemblance to most other alphabets.

There is one-to-one correspondence between Theban and the letters in the old Latin alphabet. The modern characters J and U are not represented. They are often transliterated using the Theban characters for I and V, respectively. In the original chart by Trithemius, the letter W comes after Z, as it was a recent addition to the Latin alphabet (replacing Wynn, Ƿ, which with some other letters now gone had also been at the end of the alphabet), and did not yet have a standard position. This caused it to be misinterpreted as an ampersand or end-of-sentence mark by later translators and copyists, such as Francis Barrett. Some users of those later charts transliterate W using the Theban characters for VV, parallel to how the English letter developed. Some Theban letter shapes have changed from book to book over time. Theban letters only exist in a single case.

Eric S. Raymond, an American software developer and author, has created a draft proposal for adding the Theban alphabet to the Universal Coded Character Set/Unicode.

Notes

External links

Theban alphabet at Omniglot
Theban alphabet at Theban Today
Computer font "Theban_TGEA.ttf", based on Trithemius's Polygraphia (1518)
[https://www.mediafire.com/file/j7cuj259czlg9aq/ThebanBMagic.ttf Computer font "ThebanBMagic", based on Agrippa/Barrett, with added symbols for punctuation, numbers, etc.]

Artificial scripts used in mysticism
Ciphers
Wicca
Language and mysticism